Everton Water Tower is a water tower situated on Margaret Street in Everton, Liverpool. Now surrounded by a modern housing estate it is a Grade II listed building.  The water tower is a well-known landmark dating from 1857 and can be seen from most of Liverpool standing at the top of Everton brow.

Structure

The tower consists of 3 stages. The first stage is made up of an arcade of 12 arches in a rusticated style. The second stage also consists of a 12 arch arcade with each arch having an impost band and keystone and a top bracketed cornice. The final stage is recessed and contains the water tank with iron supporting brackets.

History
The building was placed up for sale by owner, United Utilities, in July 2018 as they maintained the structure no longer had any operational use and had not been used for the storage or distribution of water for "many years." The tower was taken off sale later in the month when it was revealed that United Utilities had been approached by a charity with a proposal for the future use of the site. Despite the proposals, nothing came of them and in February 2019 the building was auctioned and sold to an unknown buyer for £70,000.

See also
Grade II listed buildings in Liverpool-L6

References

External links

Everton Water Tower at Night

Towers completed in 1864
Grade II listed buildings in Liverpool
Water towers in the United Kingdom